John Keating Regan (March 26, 1911 – March 9, 1987) was a United States district judge of the United States District Court for the Eastern District of Missouri.

Education and career

Born in St. Louis, Missouri, Regan received a Bachelor of Laws from Benton College of Law (now defunct) in 1934. He was in private practice in St. Louis from 1935 to 1939, and was an assistant prosecuting attorney of St. Louis from 1939 to 1942. He was a lieutenant in the United States Navy during World War II, from 1942 to 1945. He returned to private practice in St. Louis from 1945 to 1949. He was a judge of the Eighth Judicial Circuit Court of Missouri from 1949 to 1962.

Federal judicial service

On March 5, 1962, Regan was nominated by President John F. Kennedy to a seat on the United States District Court for the Eastern District of Missouri vacated by Judge Randolph Henry Weber. Regan was confirmed by the United States Senate on April 2, 1962, and received his commission on April 3, 1962. He was a Judge of the Temporary Emergency Court of Appeals from 1977 to 1987. He assumed senior status on April 7, 1977, serving in that capacity until his death on March 9, 1987.

References

Sources

External links
 John Keating Regan papers (1959–1980) in the Western Historical Manuscript Collection, University of Missouri-St. Louis

1911 births
1987 deaths
Missouri state court judges
Judges of the United States District Court for the Eastern District of Missouri
United States district court judges appointed by John F. Kennedy
20th-century American judges
United States Navy officers
20th-century American lawyers